Hong Kong Eye Hospital, located in Kowloon City District, Hong Kong, is a secondary and tertiary eye referral centre, and also the house of the Department of Ophthalmology and Visual Science of the Chinese University of Hong Kong (CUHK). The hospital provides training programmes in ophthalmology for medical students of both the CUHK and the University of Hong Kong.

History
Hong Kong Eye Hospital was officially opened on 15 September 1993 by David Robert Ford, Chief Secretary of Hong Kong.

External links

References

Hospitals in Hong Kong
1992 establishments in Hong Kong
Hospitals in Kowloon City District